Arctic Umiaq Line A/S (AUL) or Arctic Umiaq is a passenger and freight shipping line in Greenland. Its name derives from the Kalaallisut word for the traditional Inuit passenger boat, the umiak, distinguished from the kayak, used for hunting. The sea connection provided by Arctic Umiaq is a lifeline for the entire western and southwestern Greenland. It is a wholly owned subsidiary of the Royal Arctic Line.

History

Arctic Umiaq Line was founded in 2006. Like many Greenlandic companies, it can trace its operations to former divisions of the Royal Greenland Trade Department before its 1986 handover to the Greenland Home Rule Government.

Since 2007, Arctic Umiaq Line has been operating at a deficit,  with the CEO Søren Grønhøj Andersen sued for mismanagement. The company carried fewer passengers for the first nine months of 2009 than in the comparable period of the previous year.

The Greenland Home Rule Government has continued to provide loss guarantees to the joint owners. In fiscal 2011, this amounted to DKK 8.1 million, and Royal Arctic Line announced that loss guarantees have been secured through 2016.

Ownership in The Arctic Umiaq Line was shared equally between Air Greenland and Royal Arctic Line until 2016. In 2016, Air Greenland sold its 50% stake in the company to Royal Arctic Line, and since July 1, 2016 the Arctic Umiaq Line has operated as a wholly owned subsidiary of Royal Arctic Line.

Operations

The ferry service operates from late April until early January. , Arctic Umiaq Line employs 43 people, operating one ship on the Ilulissat-Narsaq route along the coast of western and southwestern Greenland.

Ports of call
The Sarfaq Ittuk stops in the following towns on its coastal journey, with the approximate times for a southbound journey listed for illustration:

Until 2008, the service had been extended to Narsarsuaq during summer.

Fleet

Current fleet
The only ship in operation is M/S Sarfaq Ittuk (IMO 8913899). Built in 1992, it was subsequently renovated and upgraded in 2000 in the Gdańsk Shipyard in Gdańsk, Poland.

The ship has a 249-passenger capacity, with 52 2-bed cabins, and 145 communal (compartment or couchette) rollout beds on the two lower decks.

It has a length (overall) of 72.8 m, a Gross tonnage of 2118 t, and freight capacity (Deadweight) of 163 t.

Former fleet
M/S Sarpik Ittuk  which serviced the Upernavik Archipelago, the Uummannaq Fjord region, and Disko Bay  was sold in 2006 to Nova Cruising, a company from the Bahamas.

As of 2010 Disko Bay is served by Diskoline on the governmental contract, whereas transport services between Upernavik Archipelago and the Uummannaq Fjord region are provided by infrequent cargo/ferry ships of Royal Arctic Line.

Photographs

References

Shipping companies of Greenland
Companies based in Nuuk
Transport in Nuuk